Mokari is a large village in Bhabua block of Kaimur district, Bihar, India. As of 2011, its population was 8,398, in 1,458 households.

References 

Villages in Kaimur district